Sue Station is the name of two train stations in Japan:

 Sue Station (Fukuoka) (須恵駅)
 Sue Station (Kagawa) (陶駅)